Polycnemum is a genus of flowering plants in the family Amaranthaceae/Chenopodiaceae, native to central, eastern and southern Europe, Morocco, Algeria, Turkey, and Central Asia. Basal in its clade, it has been suggested that it be given its own family, Polycnemaceae.

Species
Currently accepted species include:
Polycnemum arvense L.
Polycnemum fontanesii Durieu & Moq.
Polycnemum heuffelii Láng
Polycnemum majus A.Braun ex Bogenh.
Polycnemum perenne Litv.
Polycnemum verrucosum Láng

References

Amaranthaceae
Amaranthaceae genera